This is a list of American composers, alphabetically sorted by surname. It is by no means complete. It is not limited by classifications such as genre or time periodhowever, it includes only music composers of significant fame, notability or importance. Some further composers are included in :Category:American composers.

A

B

C

D

E

F

G

H

I

J

K

L

M

N

O

P

R

S

T

U 

Ken Ueno (born 1970)
Chinary Ung (born 1942)

V

W

Y

Z

See also 
Chronological list of American classical composers
List of American Northwest composers

References

American

Composers